In 2011, the Campeonato Brasileiro Série C, the third level of the Brazilian League, will be contested by 20 clubs divided in four groups, followed by a playoff round, during 16 July and 13 November. The top four clubs, the ones which qualifies to the semifinals, will be promoted to the Campeonato Brasileiro Série B to be contested in 2012. Meanwhile, the bottom four clubs, the ones that finish in last place of each group, will be relegated to 2012 Série D.

Team information

Format
 First Stage:  The 20 teams are divided in four groups of 5, playing within them in a double round-robin format. The two best ranked in each group advance towards next stage. The last placed team in each group is relegated to Série D 2012
 Second Stage: The eight qualified teams are divided in two groups of 4, playing within them in a double round-robin format. The two best ranked in each group are promoted to Série B 2012.Winners qualify to the Finals.
 Finals: Second stage winners play in two-leg format, home and away. Winners are declared champions.

Tiebreakers
If two or more teams are equal on points on completion of the group matches, the following criteria are applied to determine the rankings
1. Higher number of wins
2. Superior goal difference
3. Higher number of goals scored

First stage

Group A (North)

Group B (Northeast)

Group C (Southeast/Central-West)

Group D (South/Southeast)

Second stage

Group E

Group F

Finals

First leg

Second leg

Final standings
Note that no round-robin will be played involving all clubs; positions will depend on individual scoring.

References

Campeonato Brasileiro Série C seasons
3